The Bud Fendley House is a historic house at 201 Spring Street in Marshall, Arkansas.  It is a single-story wood-frame structure, its exterior clad in brick with wooden trim.  It has a front-facing gable roof with broad eaves that have exposed rafter ends and large brackets in the Craftsman style.  A front porch, supported by brick posts, has similar styling.  Built about 1928, it is one of the least-altered examples of Craftsman architecture in the community.

The house was listed on the National Register of Historic Places in 1993.

See also
National Register of Historic Places listings in Searcy County, Arkansas

References

Houses on the National Register of Historic Places in Arkansas
Houses completed in 1928
Houses in Searcy County, Arkansas
National Register of Historic Places in Searcy County, Arkansas
1928 establishments in Arkansas